Alan Waller Woodruff  (27 June 1916 - 12 October 1992) was a British medical doctor, an expert on tropical diseases.

He was Wellcome Professor of Clinical Tropical Medicine at the London School of Hygiene and Tropical Medicine, from 1952 to 1981, and Professor of Medicine at the University of Juba, Sudan from 1981 until his death.

He was President of the Royal Society of Tropical Medicine from 1973 to 1975.

References 

1916 births
1992 deaths
People educated at Bede Grammar School for Boys
British tropical physicians
Companions of the Order of St Michael and St George
Officers of the Order of the British Empire
Health in Sudan
Academic staff of the University of Juba
Academics of the London School of Hygiene & Tropical Medicine
Presidents of the Royal Society of Tropical Medicine and Hygiene